Grand Gedeh-2 is an electoral district for the elections to the House of Representatives of Liberia. The constituency covers Glio-Twarbo District, Konobo District, Putu District, Tchien District and the Lower Gorbo community of Cavalla District.

Elected representatives

References

Electoral districts in Liberia